"Echo Beach" is a song by Canadian musical group Martha and the Muffins. Written by band member Mark Gane, it was released as a single from their album Metro Music in 1980 and went on to reach number five in Canada, number six in Australia, and number 10 in the UK. It was certified gold in Canada on October 1, 1980, a month after Metro Music achieved gold status, and also won the Juno Award for Single of the Year. "Echo Beach" was the band's only significant international hit, although they had other popular singles in Canada.

In 2003, Q magazine listed "Echo Beach" among the 1001 best songs ever. In 2005, it was named the 35th greatest Canadian song of all time on the CBC Radio One series 50 Tracks.

Background
Echo Beach, as mentioned in the song, does not refer to a real beach, but rather a symbolic notion of somewhere the narrator would rather be, somewhere "far away in time". The song was created while Gane was working checking wallpaper for printing faults. He found the work rather dull and his mind drifted to times he would like to live over again. One such time was an evening spent at Sunnyside Beach on the shoreline of Lake Ontario in Toronto in summer. 'Echo Beach' was a reference made to a faded time and place gone in the lyrics of the song "Hiroshima Mon Amour" by the band Ultravox. The map shown on the cover of one version of the single is of Toronto Islands, while another single shows the north-western end of the Fleet Lagoon and the bar of Chesil Beach, the location of Abbotsbury Swannery in Dorset.

In 2010, the band released a 30th anniversary version of "Echo Beach". A commentator described the new version as "definitely a different song compared to the previous version; it's slower and the famous guitar riff that introduces the song is acoustic. [The original] was also good to be danced to, whereas the new one is darker and languid." Mark Gane explained, "We wanted to commemorate the 30th anniversary of the song, by not trying to replicate the version that we originally recorded, but as musicians who've experienced three decades of living. We'd like to refer to the new recording of 'Echo Beach' as our 'grown-up' version."

In June 2011, concert promoter Live Nation opened a 4,000-person outdoor concert facility in Toronto and named it after the song.

Track listing
 7-inch single
A. "Echo Beach" – 3:38
B. "Teddy the Dink" – 3:32

Charts

Weekly charts

Year-end charts

Certifications

Toyah version

British singer Toyah covered "Echo Beach" on her 1987 album Desire. The song was released as the lead single from the album and reached number 54 in the UK Singles Chart. It is Toyah's last charting single in the UK to date.

Track listings
 7-inch single
A. "Echo Beach" – 3:20
B. "Plenty" – 3:40

 12-inch single
A. "Echo Beach" (Surf mix) – 5:36
B1. "Echo Beach" (7-inch mix) – 3:20
B2. "Plenty" – 3:40

Charts

Other versions
 Robert Forster covered the song on his 1994 album I Had a New York Girlfriend.
 An adaptation of the song, titled "Egoiste" (translated as "Selfish"), was released by French singer-songwriter La Grande Sophie on her 2005 album La Suite, in which the lyrics have been changed, while the music and layout of the song remains the same.
 Gabriella Cilmi covered the song; her version was used as the theme for the soap opera of the same name and appeared exclusively on the deluxe UK edition of her 2008 album Lessons to Be Learned. 
 The 2009 song "Box 'n' Locks" by MPHO samples the melody from "Echo Beach".

In popular culture
"Echo Beach" was used in the 2005 British film The Business, the 2008 comedy series, Moving Wallpaper, for which it can be heard in the first episode, and it was also part of the soundtrack for the 2016 Greek film, Suntan.

References

External links
 The official Martha and the Muffins website
 The official Toyah website

1980 songs
1980 singles
1987 singles
Martha and the Muffins songs
Toyah Willcox songs
Gabriella Cilmi songs
Song recordings produced by Mike Howlett
Juno Award for Single of the Year singles
Songs about beaches